Guy Gale was a British racing driver, as well as a Major in the British Army.

Racing Driver

Guy was a competent racing driver who raced mainly between 1949 and 1953. During these years, recording a number of good results, including six wins and 22 podiums finishes, with the majority of these at national events. His greatest racing achievement, when partnered by James Scott Douglas, he finished second in the 1953 24 Heures de Spa Francorchamps.

Racing record

Career highlights

Complete 24 Hours of Spa results

References

24 Hours of Spa drivers
World Sportscar Championship drivers